Joona Toivio (born 10 March 1988) is a Finnish footballer who plays as a defender for Veikkausliiga club HJK.

He has previously played for Klubi 04, AZ, Telstar, Molde, Djurgården, and Termalica Nieciecza.

Club career

Early career
Earlier in his career, he was training with HJK's first team before he had a trial at Manchester United. Though this proved unsuccessful, he later signed for AZ. He did not make a single appearance during his two years with AZ, and had a loan spell with Telstar before he decided to move to Swedish side Djurgårdens IF in January 2010.

Molde
On 13 March 2013, Toivio signed for Norwegian side Molde, as a replacement for Vegard Forren who had moved to Southampton.

On 23 November 2013, he was an unused substitute as Molde defeated Rosenborg in the 2013 Norwegian Football Cup Final by a score of 4–2. Molde would reach the final of the Norwegian Cup the following year as well, and this time Toivio started the match as Molde once again were crowned champions, with a 2–0 win over Odd.

Häcken
In 2018, after leaving on a bosman from Termalica Nieciecza, Joona Toivio signed for Swedish side Häcken. He made his competitive debut for the club on 19 August 2018 in a 2–0 away victory over Sundsvall, registering an assist on Alexander Jeremejeff's 54th-minute goal.

On 30 May 2019, Toivio scored for Häcken in the 2019 Svenska Cupen Final, a convincing 3–0 victory over AFC Eskilstuna.

During the 2020 Allsvenskan season, Tovio played every minute for Häcken as the club finished in third place and qualified for the Europa Conference League second qualifying round.  Häcken reached the 2021 Svenska Cupen Final where they faced Hammarby at the Tele2 Arena on 30 May 2021. After finishing 0–0 after extra time, the match went to penalty-kicks; Toivio converted his kick but Häcken fell 4–5 in the shoot-out with the solitary miss coming from Bénie Traoré.

HJK
On 1 November 2021, he signed a three-year contract with HJK beginning in 2022.

International career
Toivio was the captain of the under-21 team, for whom he played in both midfield and in defense.

Since his senior debut in 2011, Toivio has been capped over 70 times for Finland.

In June 2021, Toivio was selected to the final 26-man squad for the rescheduled UEFA Euro 2020 tournament. It was Finland's first appearance in a major tournament. Toivio started the nation's first match, a 1–0 win over Denmark in Copenhagen on 12 June. The game was overshadowed and initially suspended by the on-field collapse and cardiac arrest of Danish midfielder Christian Eriksen. He played in two other group stage matches as well.

Toivio announced his retirement from international football after 2022 FIFA World Cup qualification match against France on November 16, 2021, along with fellow centre-back Paulus Arajuuri.

Career statistics

Club

International
.

International goals
Scores and results list Finland's goal tally first.

Honours
Molde
Eliteserien: 2014
Norwegian Cup: 2013, 2014

BK Häcken
Svenska Cupen: 2018–19; runner-up: 2020–21

References

External links
UEFA profile

1988 births
Living people
People from Sipoo
Association football defenders
Finnish footballers
Finland international footballers
Finland under-21 international footballers
Klubi 04 players
AZ Alkmaar players
SC Telstar players
Djurgårdens IF Fotboll players
Molde FK players
BK Häcken players
Helsingin Jalkapalloklubi players
Eliteserien players
Allsvenskan players
Eerste Divisie players
Ekstraklasa players
UEFA Euro 2020 players
Finnish expatriate footballers
Expatriate footballers in the Netherlands
Expatriate footballers in Sweden
Expatriate footballers in Norway
Expatriate footballers in Poland
Finnish expatriate sportspeople in the Netherlands
Finnish expatriate sportspeople in Sweden
Finnish expatriate sportspeople in Norway
Finnish expatriate sportspeople in Poland
Sportspeople from Uusimaa